The LSU Department of Finance is part of the E. J. Ourso College of Business of Louisiana State University, located on the university's main campus in Baton Rouge, LA. The department currently consists of 30 faculty members, including five chairs and several professorships. Some of its features include the Securities Market Analysis Research and Trading (SMART) Lab and the Real Estate Research Institute. The department is both a CFP Board-Registered Program and a CFA Program Partner offering curricula for undergraduate and graduate students interested in careers in corporate finance, asset management, real estate, insurance, banking, financial planning and business law through B.S, M.S., and Ph. D programs.

History 
The Department of Finance is one of seven degree-granting units in the E. J. Ourso College of Business. The roots of the department and college go back to 1899 when LSU created a four-year curriculum in commerce within the College of Arts and Sciences. By 1928, roughly coincident with the university's move to its present campus, a separate College of Commerce was established, in which the Department of Economics and Business Administration provided instruction in finance. 

Graduate education became part of the department's mission in the mid-1930s, with the Master of Business Administration (1935), the Master of Science (1936), and a doctoral program (1938). "Insurance and Real Estate" was the first finance-specific undergraduate curriculum to appear in the university catalog, in 1945. 

In 1959, the college was reorganized and renamed the College of Business Administration, with a separate Department of Finance, consisting of eight faculty members, and a curriculum in Finance. Business law was included within the department, possibly because of the financial aspects of property law, securities law, and contract law. 

Reflecting the trend toward quantitative analysis as a part of the research and practice of finance; between 1963 and 1971, the department provided instruction in statistics, and was titled the Department of Business Finance and Statistics. In 1965, the first privately supported, named chair on campus, the Louisiana Bankers Association Chair of Banking, was established in the department. 

In 1971, the college again reorganized, separating the department into a Department of Quantitative Methods and a Department of Finance. Business law faculty remained within the Department of Finance. In 1978, the college moved from Himes Hall to Patrick F. Taylor Hall (Formerly known as the Center for Engineering and Business Administration, or CEBA). In 1981, the Louisiana Real Estate Commission Chair in Real Estate, the first fully endowed chair on the LSU campus, was established. The mid-1980s also saw the establishment of the Real Estate Research Institute within the department. In 2002, the Department opened the SMART Lab, a 50-station simulated interactive trading floor and research facility. In 2005, the LSU Foundation established the Student Managed Investment Fund, an investment portfolio funded by the LSU Foundation and managed by a select group of students each semester. The contributions of alumni and other benefactors over the years has resulted in the endowment of five chairs and several professorships for the department. 

In 1996, the college was renamed the E. J. Ourso College of Business Administration in honor of its major benefactor. In 2005, the name was officially shortened to the E. J. Ourso College of Business. The college also recently unveiled its state-of-the-art Business Education Complex, designed to provide business students with a "campus within a campus."

Program partnerships

CFA partnership 
In 2009 the E. J. Ourso College of Business was named a CFA Program Partner by the CFA Institute, a global association for investment professionals that awards the Chartered Financial Analyst designation.  Recognition as a CFA Program Partner provides a signal to potential students, current students, and the marketplace that the E. J. Ourso College's curriculum is closely tied to professional practice and is well suited to preparing students to sit for the CFA exams. 

The official partnership signing for LSU was held in the Securities Markets Analysis Research and Trading (SMART) Lab on April 21, 2009 with CFA Institute University Relations Head Bob McLean, CFA representing the organization. Representing LSU were E. J. Ourso College Dean Eli Jones and Gary Sanger, distinguished chair in finance and director of the SMART Lab.

Registered CFP Program 
Department of Finance has registered with the Certified Financial Planner Board of Standards Inc. to provide a new financial planning undergraduate specialization (Fall 2011). Students who complete the financial planning pathway at LSU will be eligible to sit for the national CFP® Certification Examination administered by CFP Board to become Certified Financial Planner™ professionals. Chad Olivier, CFP®, president of the Baton Rouge Financial Planning Association, has vocally voiced his support of the program. LSU Finance also offers a new option for MS Finance CFP concentration, where MS Finance students can specialize in financial planning.

Institutes and labs

Securities Market Analysis Research and Trading (SMART) Lab 
Funded by LSU's Center for Computation & Technology (CCT), the E. J. Ourso College of Business's Securities Markets Analysis Research and Trading Lab, or SMART Lab, recreates a simulated interactive trading floor where students gain experience in securities analysis, research and trading. The lab's 50 networked workstations are equipped with professional analytic software, which gives students significant on-the-job-style training in portfolio construction, risk management, and financial engineering. In addition, the SMART Lab provides faculty and graduate students access to professional tools for research in experimental economics and price discovery theory.  The SMART Lab is home to no less than Twelve Bloomberg Terminals. 

The current lab Director is Dr. Gary Sanger, former Department Chair, and active CFA Institute member. Dr. Sanger is most noted for his contributions to the CFA Exams by volunteering to write questions grade exams. In 2010 he was awarded the C. Steward Sheppard Award by the CFA Institute.

Student Managed Investment Fund (SMIF) 
Each semester the SMART Lab serves as both a classroom and teaching aide for the students managing the LSU Student Managed Investment Fund (SMIF), or the Tiger Fund. The Tiger Fund was founded in the spring of 2005 by a grant from the LSU foundation. The primary investment objective of the Tiger Fund is to achieve long-term capital growth by investing in marketable U.S. equities and exceed the total return of the Fund's benchmark index. The Fund previously used the Standard & Poor's 100 Index as a benchmark, but now uses the Russell Indexes, specifically 200 Index.

Real Estate Research Institute 
The Real Estate Research Institute was formed to encourage, support, and conduct research in real estate. The Louisiana Real Estate Research Institute was established in 1985 with funding from the E. J. Ourso College of Business and the Louisiana Real Estate Commission. 

Continued funding for the institute has been provided various private sources along with grants. Institute faculty are subsidized by the Louisiana Real Estate Commission Endowed Chair of Real Estate, the Latter and Blum Professorship of Business Administration, and the C. J. Brown Professorship of Real Estate.
 
In terms of professional outreach, the RERI, along with the Baton Rouge Association of Realtors, hold the annual Trends in Baton Rouge Real Estate which typically attract between 300-500 attendees.

Student organizations

Tigers on the Street 
Founded by LSU finance alum Ryan Roberge, Tigers on the Street is a network of undergraduate and graduate finance majors.

Student Finance Association 
The Student Finance Association (SFA) is an informative support group for finance students and faculty. Activities are designed to encourage students to socialize with fellow students, faculty members, and economists in the business community. The society also offers assistance with job searches and graduate school information.

Student Real Estate Association

Masters Student Finance Association 
The Masters Student Finance Association (MFSA) is a registered student organization concentrated on educating Finance majors by bringing in professional speakers, internship/career opportunities, and participating in outside activities such as the investment club, the annual trip to New York City, community service around Baton Rouge and more.

Degree programs

Master of Science Program

PhD Program
The PhD program in Business Administration with a major in Finance is an intensive course of study in the theory and empirics of Finance. Coursework has been designed to introduce the student to all basic areas of Finance, but the responsibility for mastering the material, of course, lies with the student. To be successful in this program, the student must be committed to the highest level of academic achievement.

Forums
The LSU Finance Stakeholder's Forum provides involvement and internship opportunities for LSU Finance students.

Awards and recognition
MS Finance ranked 40th in North America for 2012–13 by Eduniversal (11th among public universities).

References

External links
 

Finance